The Emanuel County School District is a public school district in Emanuel County, Georgia, United States, based in Swainsboro. It serves the communities of Adrian, Garfield, Nunez, Oak Park, Stillmore, Summertown, Swainsboro, and Twin City.

Schools
The Emanuel County School District has four elementary schools, two middle schools, and two high schools.

Elementary schools
Twin City Elementary School
Swainsboro Elementary School
Swainsboro Primary School

Middle schools
Emanuel County Institute
Swainsboro Middle School

High school
Emanuel County Institute
Swainsboro High School

References

External links

School districts in Georgia (U.S. state)
Education in Emanuel County, Georgia